The United Nations Educational, Scientific and Cultural Organization (UNESCO) World Heritage Sites are places of importance to cultural or natural heritage as described in the UNESCO World Heritage Convention, established in 1972. The Federative Republic of Brazil accepted the convention on 1 September 1977, making its historical sites eligible for inclusion on the list. As of 2023, there are 23 World Heritage Sites in Brazil, including fifteen cultural sites, seven natural sites and one mixed site.

The first site in Brazil, the Historic Town of Ouro Preto, was inscribed on the list at the 4th Session of the World Heritage Committee, held in Paris, France in 1980. In 1983, Jesuit Missions of the Guaranis was accepted to the list in a joint bid with Argentina, making it Brazil's first trans-border property. Iguaçu National Park was enlisted in 1986 as the first site selected for its natural significance. Brazil's latest contribution to the World Heritage List, the Sítio Roberto Burle Marx, was inscribed in 2021.

In addition to its inscribed sites, Brazil also maintains twenty-three properties on its tentative list.

World Heritage Sites

Site; named after the World Heritage Committee's official designation
Location; at city, regional, or provincial level and geocoordinates
Criteria; as defined by the World Heritage Committee
Area; in hectares and acres. If available, the size of the buffer zone has been noted as well. A lack of value implies that no data has been published by UNESCO
Year; during which the site was inscribed to the World Heritage List
Description; brief information about the site, including reasons for qualifying as an endangered site, if applicable

Tentative list

In addition to sites inscribed on the World Heritage list, member states can maintain a list of tentative sites that they may consider for nomination. Nominations for the World Heritage list are only accepted if the site was previously listed on the tentative list. As of 2017, Brazil lists twenty-three properties on its tentative list:

Rocas Atoll (Rio Grande do Norte) (06/09/1996)
Amazonia Theaters (Teatro Amazonas and Theatro da Paz) (30/01/2015)
Anavilhanas Ecological Station (16/09/1998)
Brazilian Fortresses Ensemble (São Antônio de Ratones Fort, Santa Cruz de Anhatomirim Fort, Santo Amaro da Barra Grande Fortress, São João Fort, Santa Cruz da Barra Fortress, São João Fortress, Nossa Senhora de Monte Serrat Fort, Santo Antônio da Barra Fort, Santa Maria Fort, São Diogo Fort, Forte São Marcelo, São Tiago das Cinco Pontas Fort, São João Batista do Brum Fort, Santa Cruz de Itamaracá Fort, Santa Catarina Fort, Reis Magos Fort, São José Fortress, Príncipe da Beira Fort, and Coimbra Fort) (30/01/2015)
Canyon of the Rio Peruaçu, Minas Gerais (11/03/1998)
Cavernas do Peruaçu Federal Environmental Protection Area (APA) / Veredas Do Peruaçu State Park (16/09/1998)
Cedro Dam in the Quixadá Monoliths Natural Monument (30/01/2015)
Cultural Landscape of Paranapiacaba: Village and railway systems in the Serra do Mar Mountain Range, São Paulo (27/02/2014)
Nossa Senhora do Monserrate do Rio de Janeiro, Rio de Janeiro (06/09/1996)
Geoglyphs of Acre (30/01/2015)
Gold Route in Parati and its landscape (08/01/2004)
Gustavo Capanema Palace (Rio de Janeiro) (06/09/1996)
Serra da Bocaina National Park (São Paulo - Rio de Janeiro) (06/09/1996)
Itacoatiaras of Ingá River (30/01/2015)
Lençóis Maranhenses National Park (07/06/2017)
Pico da Neblina National Park (Amazonas) (06/09/1996)
Serra da Canastra National Park (16/09/1998)
Serra da Capivara National Park and Permanent Preservation Areas (16/09/1998)
Serra do Divisor National Park (16/09/1998)
Taim Ecological Station (Rio Grande do Sul) (06/09/1996)
Raso da Catarina Ecological Station (Bahia) (06/09/1996)
Ver-o-Peso (27/02/2014)

Notes

References

 
Brazil
World heritage
World Heritage Sites